Raju Maharaju is a 2009 Telugu-language film directed by Shankaranath Durga. The film stars Mohan Babu, Sharwanand, Surveen Chawla, and Ramya Krishna in the lead roles. This film has been music composed by Chakri. The film was dubbed into Tamil as Raja Maharaja. The film won two Nandi Awards.

Cast

 Mohan Babu as Chakravarthy
 Sharwanand as Kalyan
 Surveen Chawla as Sneha 
 Ramya Krishna as Ramya
 Brahmanandam as Om Raja
 Chandra Mohan
 Nassar
 Nutan Prasad
 Sunil as Gopatra
 M.S. Narayana
Jayasudha (guest role)
Tashu Kaushik
Jayaprakash Reddy 
 Surekha Vani 
Bhargavi
Dharmavarapu 
L. B. Sriram
 Rani
Raghu Babu

Soundtrack

Awards 
Nandi Awards - 2009
 Award for Best Supporting Actress - Ramya Krishna
 Nandi Special Jury Award - Kumara Swamy (Producer)

References

External links
 

2000s Telugu-language films
2009 films
Films scored by K. M. Radha Krishnan
Films scored by Chakri